XHITG-FM is a noncommercial radio station broadcasting on 89.1 FM in Tuxtla Gutiérrez, Chiapas.

History
XHSCC-FM was permitted on December 19, 2012, more than twelve years after it was applied for on October 13, 2000.

References

Radio stations in Chiapas